Pritchardomyia is a genus of robber flies (insects in the family Asilidae). There is at least one described species in Pritchardomyia, P. vespoides.

References

Further reading

 
 
 

Asilidae genera
Articles created by Qbugbot